The lycée Racine is a public school in the quartier de l'Europe located in the 8th arrondissement of Paris. It consists of a lycée as well as BTS assistant manager and BTS bank staff courses. It takes the name of Jean Racine, playwright and historiographer to the King.

The main site is served by the métro stations of Saint-Lazare, Saint-Augustin and Europe. The second site (Naples) is served by the stations Villiers, Europe and Miromesnil.

History 

Lycée Racine was built by the architect Paul Gout and opened in 1886. It was the second girls' school to open in Paris, after the lycée Fénelon.

The establishment bears the name of Jean Racine, French playwright of the 17th century.

Organisation 

The lycée is split into two sites: the main site is located at 20 rue du Rocher (Rocher), and the second site is located at 38 rue de Naples (Naples). The acquisition of the second site allowed the school to increase capacity, and start bilingual and trilingual BTS classes.

The sport classes take place in the gymnasium of Naples and in the outside areas. However, there are also some sport activities at Rocher.

Each site has its own school life, its own canteen, and its own library. Classes are run between the two sites, apart from the science track (S) and part-time courses (double courses in music and dance) which take place at Rocher for practical reasons.

Classes 

The lycée Racine includes part-time classes for those students involved in arts at a high level in national or regional conservatoires, etc. It has its own orchestra and choir.

Students are able to use their free time to practice the arts, and are offered parallel baccalauréats in literature and science.

The lycée has (school year 2016/2017) :

Lycée ranking 

In 2016, the lycée was ranked 68th out of 112 at départemental level in terms of teaching quality, and 652nd at national level. The ranking is based on three criteria: the level of bac results, the proportion of students obtaining their baccalauréat who spent their last two years at the establishment, and the value added (calculated based on social origin of the students, their age, and their national diploma results).

 97% achieved in 2016. 100% in L.

Alumni

Current and former teachers 
 Didier Blonde, writer (essays and theatre)
 Valérie Hannin, historian, editor of the magazine L'Histoire (history-geography)
 Vincent Warnier, organist (music)
 Jacques Bardin (writer)
 Lucie Aubrac

Former students 

 Violette Leduc (1907–1972), novelist
 Jeanne Balibar (1968–), actress
 Pauline Benda aka Madame Simone (1877–1985), actress and academic
 Gabrielle Dorziat, actress
 Germaine Chénin-Moselly (1902–1950), engraver
Madeleine Renaud (1900–1994), actress
 Mila Racine (1921–1945), resistant
 Monique Pelletier, politician
 Monique Canto-Sperber, philosopher
 Monique Cottret, historian
 Geneviève Page, actress
 Françoise Héritier, anthropologist
 Sabine Azéma, actress
 Élisabeth Roudinesco, psychoanalyst
 Isabelle Oehmichen, pianist
 Anne Brunswic, journalist and writer 
 Élisabeth Platel, dancer, head of the school of dance of the Opéra de Paris
 Romane Bohringer, actress
 Alice Taglioni, pianist and actress
 Adèle Exarchopoulos, actress
 Kevin Razy, humorist
 Max Boublil, humorist
 Lola Créton, actress
 Patrick Dupond, dancer 
 Thierry Malandain, choreographer, director of the ballet Biarritz
 Clément Ducol, orchestrator
 Marc Coppey, cellist
 Abdel Rahman El Bacha, pianist
 Clovis Cornillac, comedian
 Laurent Hilaire, dancer and master of the ballet of the Opéra de Paris.
 François-Xavier Roth, orchestrator
 Isabelle Guérin (dancer in the Ballet of the Opéra national de Paris)
 Jean-François Zygel (pianist)
 Jérôme Bonnell (director)
 Pierre Pincemaille, musician and organist.

See also 

 History of the education of girls in France
 Girls' schools

Notes and references

External links 
  Site officiel du lycée Racine

Racine
Lycee Racine
Racine
School buildings completed in 1886